Prasanta Kumar Majumdar (1 January 1941 – 27 March 2019) was an Indian Politician belonging to the Revolutionary Socialist Party. He was elected to the Lok Sabha, lower house of the Parliament of India from Balurghat West Bengal in 2009. He died on 27 March 2019 at the age of 78.

References

External links
 Official biographical sketch in Parliament of India website

1941 births
2019 deaths
India MPs 2009–2014
Revolutionary Socialist Party (India) politicians
Lok Sabha members from West Bengal
People from Balurghat